The Śmieszka is a river in Poland, a tributary of the Smortawa near Błota

References

Rivers of Poland
Rivers of Opole Voivodeship